The Chevron B20 is an open-wheel formula racing car, designed, developed and built by British manufacturer Chevron Cars, for Formula Two, Formula Atlantic, and Formula Three racing, in 1972. It was an evolution of the previous B18. It was powered by the  Ford-Cosworth FVA four-cylinder engine, making .

References

Formula Three cars
Formula Two cars
Formula Atlantic
1970s cars
Chevron racing cars